Whipholt is an unincorporated community and census-designated place (CDP) in Pine Lake Township, Cass County, Minnesota, United States, along Leech Lake.  Its population was 99 as of the 2010 census.  The community is located along State Highway 200 (MN 200) near Pine Lake Road.  Whipholt is 13 miles east of Walker.

Demographics

References

Census-designated places in Cass County, Minnesota
Census-designated places in Minnesota
Unincorporated communities in Cass County, Minnesota
Unincorporated communities in Minnesota